The Raga River is a river of South Sudan, a right tributary of the Boro River.

Course

The Raga River rises in Western Bahr el Ghazal near the border with Haut-Mbomou in the Central African Republic.
It flows in a northeast direction past the town of Raga to its confluence with the Boro.

Health

The river is home to Onchocerca volvulus, the parasite that causes Onchocerciasis, which causes blindness and is a serious public health issue. 
The disease is mainly concentrated on villages who use the river for fishing, drinking, bathing and washing.

Notes

Sources

Rivers of South Sudan